Nephila sumptuosa, the red-legged golden orb-web spider, is a species of golden orb-web spider.

Description
These large spiders have long reddish legs with clumps of hair. The abdomen is blackish and shows a series of whitish spots.

As is usual among orb-weavers, there is marked sexual dimorphism in general appearance, but especially in size.

Distribution
This species is present in East Africa and in Socotra.

References

Bibliography
Gerstäcker, A. (1873) Arachnoidea., In von der Decken, C. (ed.), Reisen in Ostafrica. Leipzig, 3(2): 461-503 (Araneae, pp. 473–503).
Pickard-Cambridge, O. (1898b). Arachnida. In: Dixey, F., Mal Burr, & O. Pickard-Cambridge (eds.) On a collection of insects and arachnids made by Mr E. N. Bennett in Socotra, with descriptions of new species. Proceedings of the Zoological Society of London 1898, 387-391
Platnick, Norman I. 2011. The World Spider Catalog, v.11.0. American Museum of Natural History. Database built by Robert J. Raven
Pocock, R. I. (1903g). Arachnida. In: Forbes, H. O. (ed.) The Natural History of Sokotra and Abd-el-Kuri. Special Bulletin of the Liverpool Museum, pp. 175–208.

External links
 Pbase
 Morten Ross

Araneidae
Spiders of Africa
Fauna of Socotra
Spiders described in 1873